Kaiki may refer to:
Kaiki Nobuhide, sumo wrestler
Caïque,(Greek: Kaiki, Turkish:kayık) is a wooden fishing boat usually found among the waters of the Ionian or Aegean Seas.
Kaiki (Ryukyu), a politician and diplomat of Ryukyu Kingdom.
Kaiki (footballer) (born 2003), Brazilian footballer